Arimneste was the daughter of Nicomachus and Phaestis, and Aristotle's older sister.  In addition to Aristotle, Arimneste had a brother named Arimnestus.  Her name and that of her brother translates as "Greatly remembered". Arimneste married Proxenus of Atarneus, by which they had a daughter, Hero, and a son, Nicanor.

References

 

Aristotle
Ancient Stagirites
4th-century BC Greek people
4th-century BC Greek women